The 2019 COSAFA Cup was the 19th edition of the COSAFA Cup, an international football competition consisting of national teams of member nations of the Council of Southern Africa Football Associations (COSAFA).  

The tournament was originally to be hosted in Zimbabwe but they withdrew in February 2019. In April 2019, Durban of South Africa was announced as the host city.

Venues

Match officials

Referees
Celso Alvacao (Mozambique)
Abdoul Kanoso (Madagascar)
Nehemia Shoovaleka (Namibia) 
Eugene Salas Mdluli (South Africa)
António Dungula (Angola)
Audrick Nkole (Zambia)
Lebalang Martin Mokete (Lesotho) 
Ganesh Chutooree (Mauritius)
Brighton Chimene (Zimbabwe)
Ali Mohamed Adelaid (Comoros) 
Brian Nsubuga Miiro (Uganda)

Assistant Referees
James Emile (Seychelles)
Lesupi Puputla  (Lesotho)
Athenkosi Ndongeni (South Africa)
Mogomotsi Morakile (Botswana)
Zamani Simelane (Swaziland)
Nanga A Chalwe (Zambia)
Luckson Mhara (Zimbabwe)
Bajee Ram Babajee (Mauritius)
Clemence Kanduku (Malawi)

Group stage

Tiebreakers
The ranking of each team in each group was determined as follows:
Greatest number of points obtained in group matches
Goal difference in all group matches
Greatest number of goals scored in all group matches

Group A

Group B

Knockout stage

Quarter-finals

Semi-finals

Third-place playoff

Final

Plate

Semi-finals

Final

References

External links
Official site

2019
COSAFA Cup
COSAFA Cup
International association football competitions hosted by South Africa
COSAFA Cup
COSAFA Cup
COSAFA Cup